FC Krasny is a Russian football team based in Krasny. It was founded in 2002 and played on the amateur level. For 2020–21 season, it received the license for the third-tier Russian Professional Football League. It failed to receive the PFL license for the 2021–22 season.

References

Association football clubs established in 2002
Football clubs in Russia
Sport in Smolensk Oblast
2002 establishments in Russia